Chop, CHOP, Chops, or CHOPS may refer to:

Art
Embouchure, in music, a synonym for chops (and later, more broadly, musical skill or ability)
CHOPS, an Asian-American hip hop producer, rapper and member of rap group Mountain Brothers
Chops (Euros Childs album), 2006
Chops (Joe Pass album), 1978

Medicine
Children's Hospital of Philadelphia, one of the largest and oldest children's hospitals in the world
CHOP (chemotherapy), a chemotherapy treatment for non-Hodgkin's lymphoma
DNA damage-inducible transcript 3, a genetic protein also known as "CHOP", for "C/EBP-homologous protein"

Sports
Knifehand strike, also known as the karate chop, a fast and focused strike with the side of the hand
Chop (wrestling), offensive move in professional wrestling, used to set up an opponent for a submission hold or for a throw
Chops (juggling), a juggling pattern using three balls or clubs
Chopping the blinds, in poker, when all players fold to the blinds, who then remove their bets
Backspin, a shot such that the ball rotates backwards after it is hit, especially in table tennis or other racket sports

Other
Chop, Zakarpattia Oblast, a small city in Ukraine
Meat chop, a cut of meat usually containing a rib and served as an individual portion
Chop (fiberglass), a form of fiberglass
Cold heavy-oil production with sand, a technique for extracting difficult heavy crude oil where sand is used as a means enhancing the productivity of the oil well
Seal (East Asia), or "chop" colloquially, used in China, Japan, and other parts of East Asia to prove identity (typically on documents or art in East Asia)
Mutton chops, a colloquial term for sideburns
Capitol Hill Occupied Protest, a short-lived self-proclaimed autonomous zone in Seattle

See also
Chop Chop (disambiguation)
Chopped (disambiguation)
Chopping (disambiguation)